The Finger is a mountain in the Sawback Range of the Canadian Rockies in Alberta, Canada. The name is unofficial as it does not appear in the Canadian Geographical Names Database.

References

Two-thousanders of Alberta
Mountains of Banff National Park